NASCAR Angels was an American syndicated half-hour television series which aired in syndication in various markets.  It was hosted by Shannon Wiseman and former NASCAR Cup Series Champion Rusty Wallace.  The purpose for the show was to help those who help others by repairing their worn out vehicles with a small twist: the NASCAR Angels Dream Team only has three days to get the vehicle repaired.  The show has been described as "Extreme Makeover: Home Edition meets Pimp My Ride - NASCAR Style".  Partnering with the show were Goodyear and Gemini Auto Repair Service.

References

External links
 NASCAR website
 NASCAR Angels at NASCAR.com

Automotive television series
Angels
First-run syndicated television programs in the United States
2006 American television series debuts
2009 American television series endings